Stenhelia is a genus of copepods belonging to the family Miraciidae.

The genus has cosmopolitan distribution.

Species
Species in the genus include:
 Stenhelia bifida Coull, 1976 
 Stenhelia brevicornis Thompson & Scott, 1903

References

Harpacticoida
Copepod genera